Lake Rotoroa (Māori: "long lake") may refer to the following New Zealand lakes:

Lake Rotoroa (Northland) 
Lake Rotoroa (Tasman) 
Lake Rotoroa (Hamilton, New Zealand) (or "Hamilton Lake"), Hamilton City, Waikato, New Zealand
Lake Rotoroa (Waitomo), Waitomo District, Waikato, New Zealand

See also
Long Lake (disambiguation)
Lake Rotorua